Euryzygomatomys is a genus of South American rodents, commonly called guiaras, in the family Echimyidae. It contains two extant and one fossil species, found in Argentina, Brazil and Paraguay. They are as follows:
 Brandt's guiara (Euryzygomatomys guiara)
 Fischer's guiara (Euryzygomatomys spinosus)
 †Euryzygomatomys hoffstetteri  - Tarija Formation, Bolivia

Etymology 

Phylogeny 
Euryzygomatomys is the sister genus to Clyomys. Both taxa are closely related to the genus Trinomys.
In turn, these three genera — forming the clade of Euryzygomatomyinae — share phylogenetic affinities with a clade containing Carterodon and members of the family Capromyidae.

Analyses of craniodental characters proposed that Euryzygomatomys — and also Clyomys — may be associated with Carterodon.
However, molecular data suggest the polyphyly of this assemblage of fossorial genera.

References 

Euryzygomatomys
Rodent genera
Rodents of South America
Mammals described in 1901
Taxa named by Émil Goeldi